is a railway station on the Ōu Main Line in Yuzawa, Akita Prefecture, Japan, operated by East Japan Railway Company (JR East).

Lines

Station layout
The station has one side platform serving a single bi-directional line. The station is unattended.

History
Mitsuseki Station opened on July 1, 1930. The station has been unattended since December 1979. The station was absorbed into the JR East network upon the privatization of Japanese National Railways (JNR) on April 1, 1987.

The station building was replaced by a temporary structure in August 2017, with a new building completed in December 2017.

Passenger statistics
In fiscal 2007 (the last year for which data was published), the station was used by an average of 40 passengers daily (boarding passengers only). The passenger figures for previous years are as shown below.

Surrounding area

 Omono River

See also
 List of railway stations in Japan

References

External links

  

Stations of East Japan Railway Company
Railway stations in Japan opened in 1930
Railway stations in Akita Prefecture
Ōu Main Line
Yuzawa, Akita